Stadionul Municipal is a multi-purpose stadium in Caransebeș, Romania. It is currently used mostly for football matches, is the home ground of Progresul Ezeriș and has a capacity of 3,000 seats.

References

External links
Stadionul Municipal (Caransebeș) at soccerway.com
Stadionul Municipal (Caransebeș) at europlan-online.de

Football venues in Romania
Sport in Caraș-Severin County
Buildings and structures in Caraș-Severin County
Caransebeș